The Seetha Devi Temple at Pulpally in Wayanad district has a unique position among the temples of Kerala, for it is the only known temple to have installed deities of Lava and Kusha, children of Sree Rama and Seetha Devi. The legend of Sita, and her children Lava and Kusa is closely linked to this temple. It is believed that even the name Pulpally is connected to the bed of grass (Dharbha) on which Lava is believed to have played as a child.

Legend 

The temple pond is one of the largest in Wayanad. The etymological meaning of "Seetha" denotes soil or earth. This place and the surrounding areas are believed to be the key places in the Hindu epic Ramayana.  It is believed that when Seetha was abandoned by Rama, she reached Pulpally and was given shelter by the great Sage Valmiki. The place in Pulpally where Sita gave birth to Lava and Kusa, is called Valmiki Ashramam. Chedattinkavu is the original temple of Pulpally Temple. According to the legend Lava and Kusa the two sons of Seetha Devi stopped and caught the horse sent by Rama as part of the Ashwamedha. When Rama came to free the horse, he saw Seetha and immediately she disappeared in the earth, her mother.

While going down, her hair was caught by Rama and thus the name Chedattinkavu or Jadayattakavu to the spot. Chedattilamma (Seetha Devi) is the presiding deity of this temple along with Sapthamathrukkal. This temple is only 1 km away from the present Sita Temple. Nei (ghee) vilakku is a main offering here.

The Seetha Devi temple of Pulpally was constructed by Sri Pazhassi Raja in the 18th century. He managed the temple for many years. The meetings and discussions with his army chieftains were held in the courtyard of this temple. Later the management of this temple came in the hands of the Kuppathode family and the renowned Nair family in Wayanad. At that time most of the important temples in Wayanad were managed by different Nair families. The moopil nair (the chief) of Kuppathod family stayed at Nellaratt edom the headquarters of the family. Even now, a member of this family is designated as the trustee for the management of the temple.

During the military assault, Tipu sultan of Mysore planned to destroy this temple. But it is believed that he had to retreat because of the darkness created at noon by the supreme power of Goddess Seetha.

Another remarkable thing about this temple is that leeches, that are very common in most parts of Wayanad are not found in the area surrounding this temple. According to the legend, goddess Seetha cursed the leeches that bit Lava and Kusa and banished them from Pulpally. Another significant thing about this place is that a large number of termite mounds(valmeekam) can be seen at different spots. This is associated with the sage Valmiki, who authored the Ramayana. The temple festival, celebrated in the first week of January, also considered to be the regional festival, is attended by a large number of people belonging to different castes and creed. The temple festival which is celebrated annually in the month of January, and attracts people from various parts of Wayanad.

References 

Hindu temples in Wayanad district
Sita temples
Devi temples in Kerala
Pulpally area